SCS may refer to:

Education

Canada
 St. Clement's School, a private girls school located in Toronto
 Simcoe Composite School, a public secondary school in Norfolk County, Ontario

India
 School of Communication Studies, Panjab University, Chandigarh
 St. Columba's School, Delhi, a Catholic boys school
 St. Crispin's Senior Secondary School, in Gurgaon, Haryana

United States
 Carnegie Mellon School of Computer Science, in Pittsburgh, Pennsylvania
 Saint Christopher School, a catholic elementary school in Metairie, Louisiana
 Salisbury Christian School, a private school in Salisbury, Maryland
 Saraland City Schools, in Saraland, Alabama
 Shelburne Community School, in Shelburne, Vermont
 Shelby County Schools (disambiguation)
 Sierra Canyon School, California, United States
 Southfield Christian School, a primary and secondary private school in Southfield, Michigan
 Smithtown Christian School, in Smithtown, New York
 Stevens Cooperative School, in Hoboken and Jersey City, New Jersey
 Sumter County School District (disambiguation)

Other countries
 St. Cuthbert's Society, a college of the University of Durham
 Saba Comprehensive School, Saba, Dutch Caribbean
 St. Christopher's School, Harare, an independent, co-educational, day school in Harare, Zimbabwe
 South Crest School, a primary and secondary private school in Muntinlupa, Philippines

Geography
 South China Sea
 State of Slovenes, Croats and Serbs, a political entity that existed in 1918
 St. Clair Shores, Michigan, a city in the United States
 Scatsta Airport (IATA airport code), on Mainland, Shetland Scotland
 Shopping City Süd, a shopping mall south of Vienna, Austria

Organizations
 ScS, Suite Centres Sunderland, a UK retailer
 St. Catherine of Siena Parish, Wilmington, Delaware, a Catholic church
 Scottish Court Service, now Scottish Courts and Tribunals Service, a non-ministerial department of the Scottish Government
 Singapore Children's Society, a charitable organisation based in Singapore
 Society for Classical Studies, founded in 1869 as the American Philological Association
 Society of Christian Socialists, an American socialist organization
 Soil Conservation Service, the former name of the US Natural Resources Conservation Service
 Special Collection Service, a highly classified joint US Central Intelligence Agency-National Security Agency program
 Syrian Computer Society, Syria's domain name registration authority
 Society for Modeling and Simulation International, an American technical association
 Soil Conservation Service, the former name for Natural Resources Conservation Service

Technology
 SCS Software, a Czech video game development company
 Single-crystal silicon, a based material used in virtually all modern electronic equipment
 Self-contained system (software), a software architecture
 Sony Creative Software, an American software company
 SimCity Societies, a city-building simulation computer game
 Single Channel Simulcast, a special transmission mode, allowing the transmission of an analogue and a digital program in the same channel
 Spinal cord stimulator, an implanted medical device for chronic pain management
 Bus SCS, a domotic proprietary bus for home and building automation
 Single-byte Character Set, or SBCS, a character encoding

Other uses
 Social Credit System, a proposed national reputation system in China 
 Sea Control Ship, a small aircraft carrier
 Senior Civil Service, a salary grade in the British Civil Service
 Smooth clean surface, a metalworking process
 Someday Came Suddenly, the debut album by Attack Attack!
 Synthetic catalytic scavenger, an artificial antioxidant
 Supply chain security, in transportation and logistics
 Sweet chili sauce, a condiment